

Ea
 Gordon S. Earle b. 1943 first elected in 1997 as New Democratic Party member for Halifax West, Nova Scotia.
 Thomas Earle b. 1837 first elected in 1889 as Conservative member for Victoria, British Columbia.
 Arnold Wayne Easter b. 1949 first elected in 1993 as Liberal member for Malpeque, Prince Edward Island.

Ec
 Arthur Ecrément b. 1879 first elected in 1908 as Liberal member for Berthier, Quebec.

Ed
 James David Edgar b. 1841 first elected in 1872 as Liberal member for Monck, Ontario.
 Philip Edmonston b. 1944 first elected in 1990 as New Democratic Party member for Chambly, Quebec.
 Alexander McKay Edwards b. 1876 first elected in 1925 as Conservative member for Waterloo South, Ontario.
 Gordon Cameron Edwards b. 1866 first elected in 1926 as Liberal member for City of Ottawa, Ontario.
 Jim Edwards b. 1936 first elected in 1984 as Progressive Conservative member for Edmonton South, Alberta.
 John Wesley Edwards b. 1865 first elected in 1908 as Conservative member for Frontenac, Ontario.
 Manley Justin Edwards b. 1892 first elected in 1940 as Liberal member for Calgary West, Alberta.
 William Cameron Edwards b. 1844 first elected in 1887 as Liberal member for Russell, Ontario.

Ef
 John Efford b. 1944   first elected in 2002 as Liberal member for Bonavista—Trinity—Conception, Newfoundland and Labrador.

Eg
 Arthur C. Eggleton b. 1943   first elected in 1993 as Liberal member for York Centre, Ontario.
 Jim Eglinski b. 1948 first elected in 2014 as Conservative member for Yellowhead, Alberta.

Eh
 Ali Ehsassi b. 1970 first elected in 2015 as Liberal member for Willowdale, Ontario.

Ei
 James Daniel Eisenhauer b. 1832 first elected in 1887 as Liberal member for Lunenburg, Nova Scotia.

El
 Fayçal El-Khoury b. 1955 first elected in 2015 as Liberal member for Laval—Les Îles, Quebec.
 Angus Alexander Elderkin b. 1896   first elected in 1949 as Liberal member for Annapolis—Kings, Nova Scotia.
 Stanley Edward Elkin b. 1880   first elected in 1917 as Unionist member for St. John—Albert, New Brunswick.
 Reed Elley b. 1945   first elected in 1997 as Reform member for Nanaimo—Cowichan, British Columbia.
 George Elliott b. 1875 first elected in 1911 as Conservative member for Middlesex North, Ontario.
 John Campbell Elliott b. 1872 first elected in 1925 as Liberal member for Middlesex West, Ontario.
 Nelson Elliott b. 1925 first elected in 1979 as Progressive Conservative member for London—Middlesex, Ontario.
 Otto Buchanan Elliott b. 1886 first elected in 1935 as Social Credit member for Kindersley, Saskatchewan.
 Preston Elliott b. 1875 first elected in 1921 as Progressive  member for Dundas, Ontario.
 William Elliott b. 1837 first elected in 1878 as Conservative member for Peel, Ontario.
 William Elliott b. 1872 first elected in 1921 as Progressive  member for Waterloo South, Ontario.
 Alfred Claude Ellis b. 1919 first elected in 1953 as CCF member for Regina City, Saskatchewan.
 Jack Ellis b. 1929 first elected in 1972 as Progressive Conservative member for Hastings, Ontario.
 John Valentine Ellis b. 1835 first elected in 1887 as Liberal member for City of St. John, New Brunswick.
 Neil Ellis b. 1962 first elected in 2015 as Liberal member for Bay of Quinte, Ontario.
 Stephen Ellis first elected in 2021 as Conservative member for Cumberland—Colchester, Nova Scotia. 
 Peter Elson b. 1841 first elected in 1904 as Conservative member for Middlesex East, Ontario.
 Peter Elzinga b. 1944 first elected in 1974 as Progressive Conservative member for Pembina, Alberta.

Em
 René Émard b. 1914 first elected in 1963 as Liberal member for Vaudreuil—Soulanges, Quebec.
 Alexander Thomas Embury b. 1874 first elected in 1925 as Conservative member for Hastings—Peterborough, Ontario.
 David Emerson b. 1945 first elected in 2004 as Liberal member for Vancouver Kingsway, British Columbia.
 Henry Read Emmerson b. 1883 first elected in 1935 as Liberal member for Westmorland, New Brunswick.
 Henry Emmerson b. 1853 first elected in 1900 as Liberal member for Westmorland, New Brunswick.

En
 Frank A. Enfield b. 1920 first elected in 1953 as Liberal member for York—Scarborough, Ontario.
 John English b. 1945   first elected in 1993 as Liberal member for Kitchener, Ontario.
 Roland Léo English b. 1909 first elected in 1957 as Progressive Conservative member for Gaspé, Quebec.
 Siegfried John Enns b. 1924 first elected in 1962 as Progressive Conservative member for Portage—Neepawa, Manitoba.

Ep
 Abram Ernest Epp b. 1941 first elected in 1984 as New Democratic Party member for Thunder Bay—Nipigon, Ontario.
 Arthur Jacob Epp b. 1939   first elected in 1972 as Progressive Conservative member for Provencher, Manitoba.
 Dave Epp first elected in 2019 as Conservative member for Chatham-Kent—Leamington, Ontario.
 Ken Epp b. 1939   first elected in 1993 as Reform member for Elk Island, Alberta.

Er
 Dilman Kinsey Erb b. 1857 first elected in 1896 as Liberal member for Perth South, Ontario.
 William Gordon Ernst b. 1897   first elected in 1926 as Conservative member for Queens—Lunenburg, Nova Scotia.
 Judy Erola b. 1934 first elected in 1980 as Liberal member for Nickel Belt, Ontario.
 Nathaniel Erskine-Smith b. 1984 first elected in 2015 as Liberal member for Beaches—East York, Ontario.

Es
 William Kemble Esling b. 1868 first elected in 1925 as Conservative member for Kootenay West, British Columbia.

Et
 Denis Éthier b. 1926 first elected in 1972 as Liberal member for Glengarry—Prescott—Russell, Ontario.
 Joseph Arthur Calixte Éthier b. 1868 first elected in 1896 as Liberal member for Two Mountains, Quebec.
 Viateur Éthier b. 1915 first elected in 1962 as Liberal member for Glengarry—Prescott, Ontario.

Eu
 Raymond Pierre Eudes b. 1912 first elected in 1940 as Liberal member for Hochelaga, Quebec.
 William Daum Euler b. 1875 first elected in 1917 as Laurier Liberal member for Waterloo North, Ontario.

Ev
 Charles Robert Evans b. 1882 first elected in 1935 as Liberal member for Maple Creek, Saskatchewan.
 John Evans (Progressive) b. 1867 first elected in 1921 as Progressive  member for Saskatoon, Saskatchewan.
 John Leslie Evans b. 1941 first elected in 1979 as Liberal member for Ottawa Centre, Ontario.
 Gustave Evanturel b. 1879 first elected in 1925 as Liberal member for Prescott, Ontario.
 Charles Arthur Everett b. 1828 first elected in 1885 as Conservative member for City and County of St. John, New Brunswick.

Ey
 Mark Eyking b. 1960 first elected in 2000 as Liberal member for Sydney—Victoria, Nova Scotia.
 Doug Eyolfson b. 1963 first elected in 2015 as Liberal member for Charleswood—St. James—Assiniboia—Headingley, Manitoba.
 Karl Eyre b. 1896 first elected in 1949 as Liberal member for Timmins, Ontario.

E